Marko Mitrović (born 27 June 1992) is a Swedish football player, who plays as a striker for Portuguese club Beira-Mar.

Mitrović came through the ranks of Chelsea's Academy, and was part of their victorious Youth Cup side in 2010, and included a goal in the final against Aston Villa. He moved up to the reserves thereafter, but never made a first-team appearance. He made his professional debut for Brescia in a Coppa Italia match against Cremonese.

Early life
Mitrović was born in Högaholm in Almvik, a neighbourhood of Malmö, Sweden. He is of Serbian descent. He has a younger brother, Alexandar, and an older sister, Christina.

Club career

Early career
At the age of four, Mitrović began playing football for a local team BK Olympic but shortly moved on to Malmö FF at the age of six.

Malmö FF
Mitrović joined Malmö FF at the age of six where he spent most of his youth before moving to Chelsea FC in 2008 at the age of sixteen. He scored more goals than appearances made for the club. He did not play much for Malmö after the move.

Chelsea FC
Marko agreed to join Chelsea in January 2008, to join as a first-year scholar in June of the same year, staying with his home-town club until the transfer, with semi-regular visits to Cobham. Early signs were that Marko would score goals, and plenty of them. His arrival at Chelsea proper was delayed by participation in the Under-16 Nordic Tournament. In four games, he scored seven goals to easily finish as top goalscorer. He then won the Golden Boot in the Cobham Cup, before his first season was beset by injuries – first a thigh problem, then a back issue, and damaged ankle ligaments ended his season early. He still managed five goals in eight starts, an indication of his ability. Coming back refreshed from a summer break ahead of 2009/10, year two was Marko's breakthrough campaign. He finished top of the club's junior goalscoring ranks, a tally which compared well with the country's leading youth goalscorers, and he was a crucial part of the team's success in the FA Youth Cup, scoring the equaliser in the second leg of the Final against Aston Villa. He missed the first seven months of the 2010-11 season, having undergone surgery to repair damaged ankle ligaments early in the campaign. His return came in early March 2011, in a reserve match away to Bolton Wanderers. Injuries have, however, continued to affect him throughout the year of 2011 and into 2012, and he departed at the end of his contract in June 2012.

Brescia Calcio
In the summer of 2012, Mitrović joined the Italian Serie B club Brescia Calcio.

2012-13 season
He made his professional debut for Brescia in a Coppa Italia match against Cremonese. On 25 August 2012, he made his Serie B debut coming of the bench, in a 1-0 loss against Crotone. He finished the season scoring two goals in 22 games coming off the bench.

2013-14 season
In the first game of the 2013-14 season, Mitrović scored his first goal of the season in a Coppa Italia win against S.S. Teramo Calcio.

International career
Marko has represented Sweden at Under-16, Under-17, and Under-19 levels. He took part in Nordic Cup with Sweden where they finished as runners-up, being beaten by Norway. He is, however, also eligible to play for Serbia.

Style of play
He is tall, broad and strong, with good left foot shot and impressive skill levels. Mitrović plays an attacking role, most often playing as a striker but can also play as a winger, and is known for his finishing, pace, dribbling, positioning, strength and his aerial ability. Although left footed, he is also able to control and dribble the ball and finish well with his right foot. Mitrović is known for his pace, skill, control and dribbling ability, as well as his flair in beating players during one on one situations. Uniquely, his height, strength, jumping ability and heading technique have given him an edge in winning aerial challenges for balls, with the majority of his goals often being headers. He has often been compared to a young Zlatan Ibrahimović.

Career statistics

Honours

Club

Chelsea FC
 Cobham Cup (1): 2008-09
 FA Youth Cup (1): 2009-10
 Premier Reserve League (1): 2010-11

Individual
 Cobham Cup Golden Boot (1): 2008-09

References

 Profile at Brescia Calcio
 Profile at Chelsea F.C. (archived on 9 October 2010)
 

Living people
1992 births
Footballers from Malmö
Swedish footballers
Swedish expatriate footballers
BK Olympic players
Malmö FF players
Chelsea F.C. players
Brescia Calcio players
FC Eindhoven players
FK Radnički Niš players
Randers FC players
SønderjyskE Fodbold players
FK Dinamo Vranje players
S.C. Beira-Mar players
Serie B players
Eerste Divisie players
Serbian SuperLiga players
Danish Superliga players
Campeonato de Portugal (league) players
Association football forwards
Swedish people of Serbian descent
Sweden youth international footballers
Serb diaspora sportspeople
Swedish expatriate sportspeople in England
Swedish expatriate sportspeople in Italy
Swedish expatriate sportspeople in the Netherlands
Swedish expatriate sportspeople in Denmark
Swedish expatriate sportspeople in Portugal
Expatriate footballers in England
Expatriate footballers in Italy
Expatriate footballers in the Netherlands
Expatriate men's footballers in Denmark
Expatriate footballers in Portugal